Lafitte-Vigordane is a commune in the Haute-Garonne department in southwestern France.

Geography
The commune is bordered by six other communes: Peyssies to the north, Gratens across the river Louge to the northwest, Marignac-Lasclares across the river Louge to the west, Saint-Élix-le-Château to the southwest, Salles-sur-Garonne to the south, and finally by Carbonne to the east.

The river Louge flows through the commune, forming a border between Gratens and Marignac-Lasclares.

Population

See also
Communes of the Haute-Garonne department

References

Communes of Haute-Garonne